Frank Herbert's Dune is a three-part science fiction television miniseries based on the 1965 novel by Frank Herbert. It was written and directed by John Harrison. The cast includes Alec Newman as Paul Atreides, William Hurt as Duke Leto Atreides, and Saskia Reeves as Lady Jessica, as well as Ian McNeice as Baron Vladimir Harkonnen and Giancarlo Giannini as the Padishah Emperor Shaddam IV.

The miniseries was shot in Univisium (2.00:1) aspect ratio, although it was broadcast in 1.78:1. Frank Herbert's Dune was produced by New Amsterdam Entertainment, Blixa Film Produktion, and Victor Television Productions. It was first broadcast in the United States on December 3, 2000, on the Sci Fi Channel. It was released on DVD in 2001 by Artisan Entertainment, with an extended director's cut appearing in 2002.

A 2003 sequel miniseries titled Frank Herbert's Children of Dune continues the story, adapting the second and third novels in the series (1969's Dune Messiah and its 1976 sequel Children of Dune). The miniseries are two of the three highest-rated programs ever to be broadcast on the Sci Fi Channel.

Frank Herbert's Dune won two Emmy Awards in 2001 for Outstanding Cinematography and Outstanding Special Visual Effects in a miniseries or movie, and was nominated for a third Emmy for Outstanding Sound Editing. The series was also praised by several critics, including Kim Newman.

Main cast
 William Hurt as Duke Leto Atreides
 Alec Newman as Paul Atreides / Muad'Dib
 Saskia Reeves as Lady Jessica
 James Watson as Duncan Idaho
  as Thufir Hawat
 P. H. Moriarty as Gurney Halleck
 Robert Russell as Dr. Wellington Yueh
 Laura Burton as Alia Atreides
 Ian McNeice as Baron Vladimir Harkonnen
 Matt Keeslar as Feyd-Rautha
  as Glossu Rabban
 Jan Unger as Piter De Vries
 Giancarlo Giannini as Padishah Emperor Shaddam IV
 Julie Cox as Princess Irulan
 Miroslav Táborský as Count Hasimir Fenring
 Uwe Ochsenknecht as Stilgar
 Barbora Kodetová as Chani
 Jakob Schwarz as Otheym
 Karel Dobrý as Liet-Kynes
 Christopher Lee Brown as Jamis
 Jaroslava Šiktancová as Shadout Mapes
 Zuzana Geislerová as Reverend Mother Gaius Helen Mohiam
 Philip Lenkowsky as Guild Agent

Development
Acquiring the television rights to Frank Herbert's original six Dune novels, executive producer Richard P. Rubinstein envisioned the complex material adapted in a miniseries format, as he had done previously with Stephen King's The Stand and The Langoliers. He told The New York Times in 2003, "I have found there's a wonderful marriage to be had between long, complicated books and the television mini-series. There are some books that just can't be squeezed into a two-hour movie." Around the same time Rubenstein was first developing the material, the Sci Fi Channel's president, Bonnie Hammer, was spearheading a campaign for the channel to produce "blockbuster miniseries on a regular basis". The Dune miniseries was greenlit in November 1999. Released in 2000, Frank Herbert's Dune was the first of the Sci-Fi Channel's miniseries, followed by Steven Spielberg's miniseries Taken in 2002, and Frank Herbert's Children of Dune and Battlestar Galactica  in 2003. Rubenstein called his two Dune miniseries "science fiction for people who don't ordinarily like science fiction" and suggested that "the Dune saga tends to appeal to women in part because it features powerful female characters".

Adaptation
Director John Harrison has described his adaptation as a "faithful interpretation" in which any changes he made served to suggest what Herbert had explained subtly or not at all. The miniseries introduces elements not found in Herbert's novel, but according to the director, these serve to elaborate rather than to edit. Hurt was the first to be cast in the 2000 adaptation. A fan of the novel, he told The New York Times, "I was a science fiction junkie ... [Harrison] captured Herbert's prophetic reflection of our own age, where nation-states are competing with the new global economy and its corporate elements."

Herbert's novel begins with lead character Paul Atreides being 15 years old and aging to 18 over the course of the story. Harrison aged the character to adulthood in order to draw upon an adult acting pool for this crucial role.

The miniseries invents an extensive subplot for Princess Irulan, a character who plays little part in the plot of the first novel. Harrison felt the need to expand Irulan's role because she played such an important part in later books, and epigraphs from her later writings opened each chapter of Dune. Additionally, the character gave him a window into House Corrino. Besides the final scene, the only one of Irulan's appearances based on an actual excerpt from the novel is her visit to Feyd-Rautha. However, in the book it is a different Bene Gesserit, Margot Fenring, who visits the Harkonnen heir, on assignment from the Bene Gesserit to "preserve the bloodline" by retrieving his genetic material (through conception) for their breeding program. The miniseries does not suggest this as Irulan's motive.

A director's cut special edition was released on DVD featuring expanded footage and dialogue.

Soundtrack
A soundtrack album for the miniseries was released by GNP Crescendo Records on December 3, 2000. It contains 27 tracks composed by Graeme Revell and performed by the City of Prague Philharmonic Orchestra.

Reception
Frank Herbert's Dune aired in three parts, starting Sunday, December 3, 2000. The first installment achieved a 4.6 rating with 3 million homes, and the miniseries averaged a 4.4/2.9 million households over all three nights. This doubled all viewership records for Sci Fi, placing Dune among the top ten of basic cable's original miniseries in the five years previous. Two of the three installments also rated among the year's top 10 original cable movies. To date, the 2000 Dune miniseries and its 2003 sequel are two of the three highest-rated programs ever to be broadcast on the Sci Fi Channel.

Emmet Asher-Perrin of Tor.com deemed the miniseries a better adaptation than the 1984 Lynch film, but wrote that "it doesn't reach spectacular heights due to the desire to be as close to the written text as possible." She wrote that "the story naturally drags at certain points in the book that work in prose but not on screen", and added that "the narrative gets over-explained in an effort to be sure that no one watching is left behind." Asher-Perrin suggested that Harrison's choice to cast adult actor Newman as Paul is problematic because the character is written in the script as less mature and observant than he is in the source novel, but she praised many members of the cast, in particular McNeice (Baron Harkonnen) and Cox (Irulan). Asher-Perrin also complimented the special effects, set design, and costuming.

Awards and nominations
The miniseries was nominated for three Primetime Emmy Awards in 2001, for Outstanding Sound Editing for a Miniseries, Movie or a Special, Outstanding Cinematography for a Miniseries or Movie and Outstanding Special Visual Effects for a Miniseries, Movie or a Special, winning the latter two.

Game
The 2001 3D video game Frank Herbert's Dune by Cryo Interactive/DreamCatcher Interactive is styled after the 2000 miniseries.

Sequel
A 2003 sequel miniseries titled Frank Herbert's Children of Dune continues the story, adapting the second and third novels in the series (1969's Dune Messiah and its 1976 sequel Children of Dune).

References

External links
 
 
 
 Official Dune novels website
 
 
 
 

2000s American television miniseries
D
2000s Canadian television miniseries
2000s German television miniseries
Films based on Dune (franchise)
Films directed by John Harrison (director)
Films scored by Graeme Revell
D
D
Italian television miniseries
Syfy original programming
Television remakes of films
Television shows based on Dune (franchise)